Vadavucode is a village in the Ernakulam district in the state of Kerala, India near the town of Puthencruz. It is one of the local and Developing Village Near Puthencruz Town. Vadavucode plays a pivotal role in connecting the two villages of Kaninad and Pancode.

Vadavucode is famous for its "Kalavayal" or "Kala chantha"(cattle market) held on First Day of every Malayalam Month, Now known as "Vayalumpad"

Institutions

Schools
 Rajarshi Memorial Higher Secondary School 
 Govt.LP School Vadavucode
 RMTTI Vadavucode..

Government Offices

Village Office
Community Health Centre
Agriculture Office.
 Post Office

Worship Places

St.Mary's Malankara Orthodox Syrian Church
 Charambarambu Bhagavathi Temple
St.Mary's  Syrian Orthodox(Jacobite) Church

References

Villages in Ernakulam district